North of the Border is a 1946 American Western film.

The movie was directed by B. Reeves Eason and based on a story by James Oliver Curwood. Many of the same cast and crew also worked on 'Neath Canadian Skies.

Although the film credits James Curwood, TCM states that "the film does not appear to have been based on one of his stories."

Synopsis
American rancher "Utah" Nyes (Hayden) comes to Canada to meet his partner, Bill Lawton. He finds that Lawton has been murdered by a gang led by "Nails" Nelson (Fowley). With the help of Mountie Jack Craig (Talbot), and fur-trapper Ivy Jenkins (Jolley), "Utah" manages to clear himself of the murder of Lawton, and also to break up Nelson's gang.

Cast
 Russell Hayden as Robert "Utah" Nyes
 Inez Cooper as Ruth Wilson
 Douglas Fowley as "Nails" Nelson
 Lyle Talbot as RCMP Sergeant Jack Craig
 Anthony Warde (as Anthony Ward) as Jean Gaspee
 I. Stanford Jolley as Ivy Jenkins
 Guy Beach as George Laramie
 Jack Mulhall as RCMP Captain Swanson
 Richard Alexander (as Dick Alexander) as Tiny Muller

References

External links
North of the Border at IMDb
North of the Border at Turner Classic Movies

1946 films
1946 Western (genre) films
Lippert Pictures films
American Western (genre) films
Films directed by B. Reeves Eason
American black-and-white films
Films based on works by James Oliver Curwood
1940s English-language films
1940s American films